Héctor Narcia Álvarez (born 16 December 1957) is a Mexican politician that affiliated with the PVEM. He served as Deputy of the LXII Legislature of the Mexican Congress representing Chiapas. He also served as Deputy during the LX Legislature (then affiliated with the Party of the Democratic Revolution).

References

1957 births
Living people
People from Chiapas
Party of the Democratic Revolution politicians
Ecologist Green Party of Mexico politicians
21st-century Mexican politicians
Deputies of the LXII Legislature of Mexico
Members of the Chamber of Deputies (Mexico) for Chiapas